Tianzun (天尊), literally the Lord of Heaven may refer to:

The three highest Gods in the Taoist pantheon
Yuanshi Tianzun or Yuánshǐ Tīanzūn, also known as the Jade Pure One
Lingbao Tianzun, also known as the Lord of Lingbao and Shangqing
Daode Tianzun or Tàiqīng, also known as Taishang Laojun and Daode Zhizun
Wenshu Guangfa Tianzun, a character in the classic Chinese novel Investiture of the Gods